Curtis John Pride (born December 17, 1968) is a former Major League Baseball outfielder who is deaf. He batted left-handed and threw right-handed. In 2015, Pride was named MLB's Ambassador For Inclusion. Since 2009 Pride has served as the head baseball coach at Gallaudet University.

Youth
Deaf at birth from rubella, Pride developed oral skills early in his life and graduated from John F. Kennedy High School in Silver Spring, Maryland. He excelled in baseball, basketball, and soccer in high school. After high school, Curtis Pride attended the College of William and Mary. He was the starting point guard on the basketball team. He also was an excellent soccer player who played for the United States at the 1985 FIFA U-16 World Championship in China and scored two goals in the tournament, including the match winner against Bolivia.  He was named one of the top 15 youth prospects in the world for that year and was a 1986 Parade Magazine High School All American soccer player.  Pride uses his 5% residual hearing to help him speak and is a fluent lip-reader.

Career
Pride was originally signed by the New York Mets, but reached the major leagues with the Montreal Expos in 1993. At that time, he became the first deaf player in the majors since Dick Sipek in 1945. A left-handed hitter, with good plate discipline, and considerable speed, he never played regularly in the majors. Instead, he pinch hit or played in the outfield, usually left or right, as an injury replacement, and is regarded as an excellent fielder with a strong arm.  His first Major League hit was September 17, 1993 in Montreal. Pride's first four hits in his major league career were a double, triple, home run, and single.

Pride became a free agent before the 1996 season and signed with the Detroit Tigers, where he played well in a part-time outfield role. With fewer than 300 plate appearances in 95 games, he compiled career-high numbers in batting average (.300), home runs (10), RBI (31), runs (52), hits (80), doubles (17) triples (5), and stolen bases (11). He was expected to gain more at bats in future seasons as a result. But 1997 found him on the disabled list and he was released and signed by the Red Sox. After that, he played with the Braves, returned to Boston and Montreal, and saw a little action with the Yankees. He was signed by the Anaheim Angels in the 2004 season and was called up from Triple-A Salt Lake Stingers. In 2005, he was signed to a minor league contract with the Angels and was called up after an injury to Vladimir Guerrero. He was returned to the minors after Guerrero recovered from the injury. After spending 2007 spring training as a non-roster invitee for the Angels, he was assigned to start the season as a member of the Salt Lake Bees.

Pride signed with the Southern Maryland Blue Crabs of the independent Atlantic League on April 15, 2008. He was released by the Blue Crabs on August 23, 2008.

In an eleven-season major league career, Pride batted .250 (199-for-796) with 20 home runs and 82 RBI in 421 major league games.

Coaching career
In 2008, Pride was selected to be the baseball coach at Gallaudet University, a school for the deaf. In the summer of 2011, he served as assistant coach for the Wareham Gatemen of the Cape Cod Baseball League.

Personal life

When he is not playing baseball, Pride and his wife Lisa are actively involved in the Together With Pride foundation, which aids hard-of-hearing children through a hearing aid bank, according to the foundation's website. There are several activities the foundation supports or hopes to support, such as a scholarship program, literacy, and mentoring.

In 1996, Pride received the Tony Conigliaro Award, given annually to an MLB player who best overcomes adversity through the attributes of spirit, determination, and courage. In 2016, he won the prestigious Henry Viscardi Achievement Awards.He keeps homes in both the Washington, D.C. area and Wellington, Florida.

References

External links
, or Minor League Splits and Situational Stats, or Retrosheet, or Venezuelan Professional Baseball League, or FIFA: Curtis Pride, or Together with Pride website

1968 births
Living people
African-American baseball players
Albuquerque Dukes players
American disabled sportspeople
American expatriate baseball players in Canada
American men's basketball players
American soccer players
Anaheim Angels players
Arizona League Angels players
Arkansas Travelers players
Association football forwards
Atlanta Braves players
Baseball players from Maryland
Baseball players from Washington, D.C.
Binghamton Mets players
Boston Red Sox players
Cape Cod Baseball League coaches
Columbia Mets players
Columbus Clippers players
Deaf baseball players
American deaf people
Detroit Tigers players
Gallaudet Bison baseball coaches
Harrisburg Senators players
Jupiter Hammerheads players
Kingsport Mets players
Leones del Caracas players
American expatriate baseball players in Venezuela
Los Angeles Angels players
Major League Baseball outfielders
Mayos de Navojoa players
Montreal Expos players
Nashua Pride players
Nashville Sounds players
New York Yankees players
Norfolk Tides players
Ottawa Lynx players
Parade High School All-Americans (boys' soccer)
Pawtucket Red Sox players
People from Silver Spring, Maryland
People from Wellington, Florida
Pittsfield Mets players
Point guards
Richmond Braves players
Salt Lake Bees players
Salt Lake Stingers players
Soccer players from Florida
Soccer players from Maryland
Soccer players from Washington, D.C.
Southern Maryland Blue Crabs players
Baseball players from Atlanta
Sportspeople from Detroit
Baseball players from Florida
St. Lucie Mets players
Toledo Mud Hens players
United States men's youth international soccer players
West Palm Beach Expos players

William & Mary Tribe men's basketball players
American expatriate baseball players in Mexico
Basketball players from Detroit
Baseball players from Detroit